Ceanothus ferrisiae (sometimes spelled ferrisae) is a rare species of shrub in the family Rhamnaceae. Its common name is coyote ceanothus.

Description
Ceanothus ferrisiae grows erect to a maximum height approaching two meters. The woody parts are reddish in color when new and age gray. The evergreen leaves are oppositely arranged and measure up to 3 centimeters long. They are firm, flat, and generally toothed along the edges. The upper surface is hairless and deep green and the underside is paler in color and fuzzy in texture. The inflorescence is a small cluster of white flowers which bloom in the winter. The fruit is a rough, horned capsule just under a centimeter wide.

Distribution
Ceanothus ferrisiae is endemic to Santa Clara County, California, where it is known from only four or five occurrences near Mt. Hamilton in the Diablo Range. The largest population, located near Anderson Dam, is recovering from a 1992 wildfire that killed 95% of the plants. It is a member of the serpentine soils endemic flora and it occurs in chaparral. It is a federally listed endangered species.

Conservation
There are about 6000 individuals remaining in five occurrences. The plant is threatened by loss and degradation of its habitat, which is being cleared for construction and used for dumping. The species also seems to have low recruitment.

References

External links
Jepson Manual Treatment - Ceanothus ferrisiae
USDA Plants Profile: Ceanothus ferrisiae
Ceanothus ferrisiae - Photo gallery

ferrisiae
Endemic flora of California
Natural history of the California chaparral and woodlands
Natural history of Santa Clara County, California
Endemic flora of the San Francisco Bay Area
Plants described in 1933
NatureServe critically imperiled species
Critically endangered flora of California